Casas del Castañar is a municipality in the province of Cáceres in Spain, near the Sierra de Gredos mountain range.

References

Municipalities in the Province of Cáceres